Anoplocurius canotiae is a species of beetle in the family Cerambycidae. It was described by Fisher in 1920.

References

Elaphidiini
Beetles described in 1920